is the 34th single by Japanese entertainer Akina Nakamori. Written by Seriko Natsuno and U-ki, the single was released on February 21, 1997, by MCA Victor. It was also the second single from her 17th studio album Shaker. This was Nakamori's final single under MCA Victor before signing with Gauss Entertainment a year later.

The single peaked at No. 46 on Oricon's weekly singles chart and sold over 29,400 copies, becoming her lowest-charting and lowest-selling single at the time.

Track listing

Charts

References

External links 
 
 

1997 singles
1997 songs
Akina Nakamori songs
Japanese-language songs
Universal Music Japan singles
MCA Records singles